Brennan Rubie (born April 8, 1991) is an American alpine ski racer.

He competed at the 2015 World Championships in Beaver Creek, USA, in the giant slalom.

References

1991 births
American male alpine skiers
Living people
Place of birth missing (living people)